The Ladybrook Valley begins in the English Peak District and runs through Stockport. In its  course the brook falls . At various points it is called Bollinhurst Brook, Norbury Brook, Bramhall Brook, the Ladybrook and the Mickerbrook.

The valley has some notable features along its course including Bramall Park and the seven arches railway viaduct in Cheadle Hulme. South of Hazel Grove it is used to delineate the boundary between Greater Manchester and Cheshire. The Ladybrook is a tributary of the River Mersey, the confluence being near to Cheadle Village, immediately after flowing under the M60 motorway.

Geography of the Metropolitan Borough of Stockport
Areas of Greater Manchester